Alston Koch is a Sri Lanka born Australian - Sri Lankan singer-songwriter, film producer, record producer and actor.

He was often lauded in the Australian and Asian media as "Asia's King of Pop" or "Pop King of Asia" after gaining international success in the late 1970s. He has performed worldwide and achieved international success in Australia, Indonesia, Thailand, Malaysia, Singapore, India and Sri Lanka among other places.

He received State of California Senate's Certificate of Recognition and Certificate of Special US Congressional Recognition for improving the lives of the communities in America.

Biography

He migrated to Sydney, Australia where he was most successful in the entertainment and professional music industry while recording for RCA/Laser Records and the Australian TV Network Channel 9's "Living Sound" recording label.

In Australia, he formed his band Dark Tan and recorded three international hits on the RCA label. He has performed internationally with Dark Tan, S-witch, and as a solo artist. One notable appearance was during 'The Stars & Stripes Concert' in 1976, performing under the Sydney harbour bridge on a floating pontoon for Radio 2SM. Rock Brains Of The Universe and music historian Glenn A Baker has said that 'Alston & Dark Tan' were the originators of Disco Music in Australia. Since 1975 Koch has released 21 singles and 4 albums through record labels such as RCA, BMG, EMI and Sony.

In 1986 Alston Koch was selected and commissioned by the Australian Task Force to write, produce and perform the America's Cup album, The Kookaburra Connection with the theme song "Kookaburra" released both as a single and music video broadcast during the race.

His first self written major hit, "Disco Lady", earned him his first gold record. The song also won him and Dark Tan the 'Best New Talent' at the 1979 International Disc Jockey Association Awards (Before the ARIA'S ) and that same year Dark Tan won Australia's Observer newspaper's 'Best Disco Band' award.

The Daily Mirror (Australia) presented them with the Best Disco Band Award in 1978 and the producers of the Channel 10 TV show Thank God it's Friday presented the band with a Gold Disc during the performance of "Disco Lady".

Koch received his first ARIA (Accredited Award ) for Melissa 'Read My Lips' (1990).  Three Gold Awards and one Platinum Award from ARIA (accredited) and a recipient of a Gold Disc from RCA/Laser Records in 1978 for "Disco Lady".

Since 2007, he has been the  Ambassador for Tourism for Sri Lanka. In the same year, Koch wrote and performed an official song for The Sri Lankan cricketer and world record holder and world champion Muttiah Muralitharan.

In 2008, Koch wrote a song about climate change for a United Nations WTO  presentation in London. The song was also presented by Geoffrey Lipman Chairman of ICTP at the 'Live the Deal Climate Change' conference in Copenhagen to all the World's leaders. Alston Koch is the Goodwill Ambassador for the campaign, and the song has been promoted globally by ICTP in their campaign for green growth. Barbara Follet (Minister of State for Great Britain) certified it as 'A gift in song to the world suffering due to Climate Change' while the song received a standing ovation when performed by Alston Koch.

Alston was commissioned by Cricket Australia to sing the National Anthem at the One Day International Cricket matches and the important Boxing Day Test.

In 2009, he was appointed to the committee for the Cricket World Cup 2011 tournament staged in India, Sri Lanka and Bangladesh, and was the official 'GOODWILL AMBASSADOR' for the tournament.

In 2010, he was inducted into the Hard Rock Hotel's 'Hall of Fame' at a ceremony in Pattaya, Thailand, when the album, Kookaburra was installed on the venue's 'Golden Wall of Memorabilia'.

In April 2012 his latest album "Don't Funk With Me" written and produced by Alston & the Sherifs, debuted at No. 42 on the official ARIA top 50 Albums chart, eventually peaking at No.16. He was also the first Australian recording artist to launch a single (official release) at an International Cricket final when his song "Soul Sounds" (From the album Don't Funk with Me) was launched during the Australia Vs Sri Lanka final.

Discography

Singles
 "Don't Stop it Now" (written by Errol Brown) Koch and Dark Tan, [Living Sound Records](Channel 9) - AUS #100
 "Kings Of Soul" (Written by Alston Koch & Dark Tan) RCA/Living Sounds (Channel 9 )
 "All the People Sing this Song" (written by Alston Koch and Darktan) [Laser]
 "Disco Lady" (written by Alston Koch and Chris Connelly) AUS #70
 "Island in the Sun" (Written by Alston Koch)  RCA/Laser Records
 "Gimme That Banana" [RCA/Cinevox]Europe 
 "Closer to the Phone" (RCA Records)
 "Vanishing Lady" (RCA Records)
 "Danny Boy" (RCA/Laser Records)
 "20 MILES" (Powderworks/EMI)
 "Kookaburra" [EMI]
 "Midnite Lady" (Written by Alston Koch /Alan Stirling) (EMI) Laser 
 "Try Again" [EMI /Titanic) Aust. Mega (Scandinavia) EMI /SONET (U.K)
 "Never Felt This Way Before" [BMG/RCA]
 "With S-witch: I Want Your Love" [BMG/RCA] U.K
 "It's A Shame" (Written By Alston Koch) BMG/RCA Ariola
 "Sensual Motion" (Written by Alston Koch ) BMG/RCA Ariola 
 "MURALI" (Written by Alston Koch & Jarred Wilson) Creative Vibes Records
 "Soul Sounds" feat The Sherifs (Sony)
 "Don't Know Why" (Sony)Australia/Pacific & Rightrack Records (U.K)
 "Trees Of Babylon" (Sony) Lifestyle

Albums
 After Darktan [RCA]
 Alston and the Freemantle Doctor [EMI] KOOKABURRA 
 Move To The Rhythm (Alston Inc) BMG Crescendo (India & South East Asia)
 Don't Funk With Me [SME] Sony

Honours
Member of The Grammy Academy (U.S.A)
Member of The Australian Performing Right Association.(APRA)
Ambassador for Climate Change (I.C.T.P)
Ambassador for Sri Lanka Tourism
Member of PPCA (Performing & Publishing Copyright Association of Australia)
Member of AMCOS (Australasian Mechanical Copyright Organisation)
Ambassador for FAMILY FILM AWARDS (USA) for Australia
Ambassador for The ARTS FOR PEACE FOUNDATION (U.S.A)
Award for the Global Entertainer of the Year 2018 - Ada Derana Sri Lankan of the Year.

Filmography

Lead Actor in the Film According to Mathew
Alston played the lead role opposite Bollywood star Jacqueline Fernandez.

Executive Producer for Impact Earth, a Hollywood movie released worldwide in 2015 for Alta Vista Entertainment
Associate Producer: The Road from Elephant Pass (2011)

Gallery

References

External links

 Dark Tan – Disco Lady (Alston Koch)
 Alston Koch felicitated in ‘Highest Capital City in the World’ 

1951 births
Alumni of Wesley College, Colombo
Australian people of Sri Lankan descent
Burgher musicians
Living people
Musicians from Melbourne